Robert Menzies McAlmon (also used Robert M. McAlmon, as his signature name, March 9, 1895 – February 2, 1956) was an American writer, poet, and publisher.  In the 1920s, he founded in Paris the publishing house, Contact Editions, where he published writers such as Ernest Hemingway, Gertrude Stein, James Joyce and Ezra Pound.

Life
McAlmon was born in Clifton, Kansas, the youngest of 10 children of an itinerant Presbyterian minister. He died in Desert Hot Springs, California at age 60.

McAlmon was admitted to the University of Minnesota in 1916 but only spent one semester there before enlisting in the United States Army Air Corps in 1918. After World War I, he returned to university (1917–1920), this time at the University of Southern California. He attended classes intermittently until 1920, when he moved to Chicago and then New York City, where he worked as a nude model at an art school. Once in New York, he collaborated with William Carlos Williams on the Contact Review, which did not last for long, but published poetry by Ezra Pound, Wallace Stevens, Marianne Moore, H. D. (Hilda Doolittle), Kay Boyle and Marsden Hartley. The next year, he moved to Paris after marrying the wealthy and lesbian English writer Annie Winifred Ellerman, better known as Bryher. McAlmon typed and edited the handwritten manuscript of Ulysses by James Joyce, with whom he had a friendship.

McAlmon became a prolific writer after the move, with many of his stories and poems based on his experiences as a youth in South Dakota.

Contact Editions
Having published his book of short stories A Hasty Bunch with James Joyce's printer Maurice Darantière in Dijon in 1922, he founded the Contact Publishing Company in 1923 using his father-in-law's money. Lasting until 1929, Contact Editions brought out books by Bryher (Two Selves), H. D.'s Palimpsest, Mina Loy's Lunar Baedecker, Ernest Hemingway's first book Three Stories & Ten Poems (1923), poems by Marsden Hartley, William Carlos Williams (Spring and All, 1923), Emanuel Carnevali's only book during his lifetime (The Hurried Man), prose by Ford Madox Ford, Gertrude Stein (The Making of Americans, 1925), Mary Butts (Ashe of Rings), John Herrmann (What Happens), Edwin Lanham (Sailors Don't Care), Robert Coates (The Eater of Darkness), Texas schoolteacher Gertrude Beasley's My First Thirty Years and Saikaku Ihara's Quaint Tales of Samurais. McAlmon paid for the publication of The Ladies Almanack by Djuna Barnes.

One of McAlmon's most important and best-received works is Village: As It Happened Through a Fifteen Year Period (1924) which presents a bleak portrait of an American town. The book shows his love for Eugene Vidal (Eugene Collins in the book), Gore Vidal's father, with whom he grew up in Madison, South Dakota, which is documented in Gore Vidal's mid-90s memoir, Palimpsest.

Other works include the short story collection A Companion Volume (1923), the autobiographical novel Post-Adolescence (1923), Distinguished Air (Grim Fairy Tales) (1925), the poetry collections The Portrait of a Generation (1926), and Not Alone Lost (1937), the 1,200 line epic poem North America, Continent of Conjecture (1929), and his memoir Being Geniuses Together: An Autobiography (1938).

McAlmon returned to the United States in 1940, residing in El Paso, Texas, where he sought treatment for a pulmonary ailment. He died at Desert Hot Springs, California, almost unknown in his native country, sixteen years later.

In the 1990s, Edward Lorusso brought out three volumes of McAlmon's fiction (many were first American publications), Village (1924, 1990), Post-Adolescence (1923, 1991), and Miss Knight and Others (1992), all through University of New Mexico Press. Edward Lorusso also published Naked Truth: The Fiction of Robert McAlmon in 2020.

McAlmon is heavily featured in the book Memoirs of Montparnasse by John Glassco about the golden age of Paris in the 1920s when writers and artists flocked to the city.

His social circle and friendship with Ernest Hemingway are discussed in the novel The Paris Wife by Paula McLain.

In 2007, his fictionalized memoir The Nightinghouls of Paris was published, based on the experiences of Glassco and his friend Graeme Taylor with McAlmon in Paris. The previously unpublished book was based on a typescript held by Yale's archives.

An epistolary novel about McAlmon's life in Greenwich Village, his expatriate adventures in Paris, and final years in California, Letters from Oblivion was published by Edward Lorusso in 2014.

Bibliography

Fiction
 A Hasty Bunch. n.p., n.d. Printed by Maurice Darantière in Lyon in 1922. Short stories
 A Companion Volume. Contact, Paris 1923. Short stories
 Post-Adolescence. Contact, Paris 1923. Short stories
 Village: As It Happened Through a Fifteen Year Period. Contact, Paris 1924. Novel
 Distinguished Air: Grim Fairy Tales Contact, Paris 1925 [Photo-reprinted as There Was a Rustle of Black Silk Stockings. 1963]
 The Infinite Huntress and Other Stories. Black Sun Press, Paris 1932 
 A Scarlett Pansy (under pseudonym Robert Scully), William Farro, Inc. (Roth), 1933
 Robert E. Knoll: McAlmon and the Lost Generation. A Self Portrait. University of Nebraska, Lincoln 1962.
 Miss Knight and Others. University of New Mexico Press, 1992
 The Nightinghouls of Paris. University of Illinois Press, 2007
  "La nuit pour adresse". Maud Simonnot (Paris: Editions Gallimard, 2017)

Memoirs
 Being Geniuses Together. Secker & Warburg, London 1938. Memoir
 Being Geniuses Together. Doubleday, New York 1968 (revised with supplementary chapters by Kay Boyle)

Poetry
 Explorations. Egoist Press, London 1921.
 The Portrait of a Generation. Contact, Paris 1925.
 North America, Continent of Conjecture. Contact, Paris 1929.
 Not Alone Lost. New Directions Publishing, Norfolk, CT, 1937.

Legacy
William Saroyan wrote a short story about McAlmon in his 1971 book, Letters from 74 rue Taitbout or Don't Go But If You Must Say Hello To Everybody.

Notes

References
 
  The only biography of the author.
  Contains an insightful account of McAlmon's life.

External links
 
 Robert McAlmon Papers. Yale Collection of American Literature, Beinecke Rare Book and Manuscript Library.
 

American male poets
University of Minnesota alumni
University of Southern California alumni
Objectivist poets
Poets from Kansas
People from Clifton, Kansas
People from Desert Hot Springs, California
1895 births
1956 deaths
20th-century American poets
20th-century American male writers
People from Madison, South Dakota
Private press movement people